Companhia Brasileira de Distribuição, doing business as GPA (formerly as Grupo Pão de Açúcar), is the biggest Brazilian company engaged in business retailing of food, general merchandise, electronic goods, home appliances and other products from its supermarkets, hypermarkets and home appliance stores owned by the French conglomerate retail group Casino. Its headquarters are in São Paulo city.

The company is the second biggest retail company in Latin America by revenue and the second largest online retailer in Brazil. The company operates its e-commerce through Cnova, a subsidiary of Via Varejo.

For 2013, the company planned to open more than 150 stores, targeting northeast and mid-west regions.

In September 2013, Abílio Diniz, the son of the company's founder, has stepped down as chairman of the company.

Business units
GPA operates through different store concepts (and different banner logos):

Brazil (809 retail stores; 68 drugstores* and 74 gas station**) 

 Pão de Açúcar (181 stores)
 Minuto Pão de Açúcar (98 stores)
 Pão de Açúcar Fresh (1)
 Pão de Açúcar Adega
 Posto Pão de Açúcar**
 Extra (72 stores; being converted into Assaí wholesaling stores)
 Mercado Extra (146 stores)
 Mini Extra (141 stores)
 Drogaria Extra*
 Posto Extra**
 Compre Bem (28 stores)
 Posto Compre Bem**
 Assaí Atacadista (spun-off in 2021; currently controlled by Casino)
 Posto Assaí

Colombia (503 retail stores) 

 Grupo Éxito (233 stores)
 Surtimax (72 stores)
 Surtimayorista (36 stores)
 Super Inter (61 stores)
 Carulla (101 stores)
 Viva (shopping center)

Uruguay (92 retail stores) 
 Grupo Éxito
 Devoto (60 stores)
 Disco (30 stores)
 Géant (2 stores)

Argentina (25 retail stores) 

 Grupo Éxito
 Libertad (10 stores)
 Paseo Libertad (15 stores; shopping center)

Ownership structure
Currently, GPA is owned by:

Grupo Casino – 41.2% 
Board of Executive Officers and Board of Directors – 0.01%
Treasury stock – 0.1%
Free float – 58.3%

See also 

 Brazilian Development Bank

References

External links
  
 GPA on LinkedIn

 
Retail companies of Brazil
Companies based in São Paulo
Brazilian brands
Companies listed on B3 (stock exchange)
Companies listed on the New York Stock Exchange
Retail companies established in 1948
1948 establishments in Brazil